The Hindustan HUL-26 Pushpak was a 1950s Indian two-seat cabin monoplane designed and built by Hindustan Aeronautics Limited, based on the Aeronca Chief.

Construction and operation
The Pushpak was a high-wing braced monoplane with a fixed tailwheel landing gear. The fuselage was built from metal tubing, the wing aluminum ribs on a wooden spar, all covered in fabric. The Pushpak first flew on 28 September 1958 and was powered by a 90 hp (67 kW) Continental flat-four engine.

Around 160 aircraft were produced for Indian flying clubs for use as basic trainers. Two examples were gifted to Malaysia and were later sold to private pilot owners in the United Kingdom. These examples remained in active operation in 2013.

Operators

Current

Former

Specifications (HUL-26)

References

Notes

Bibliography

 

1950s Indian civil utility aircraft
Pushpak
Single-engined tractor aircraft
High-wing aircraft
Aircraft first flown in 1958